Blue Flames is a collaboration album by organist Shirley Scott and saxophonist Stanley Turrentine recorded in 1964 and released on the Prestige label.

Reception
Scott Yanow awarded the album 4 stars stating "All of the many collaborations between organist Shirley Scott and tenor saxophonist Stanley Turrentine in the 1960s resulted in high-quality soul jazz, groovin' music that was boppish enough to interest jazz listeners and basic enough for a wider audience".

Track listing 
 "The Funky Fox" (Shirley Scott) – 5:33  
 "Hips Knees an' Legs" (Scott) – 5:35  
 "Five Spot After Dark" (Benny Golson) – 5:27  
 "Grand Street" (Sonny Rollins) – 7:20  
 "Flamingo" (Edmund Anderson, Ted Grouya) – 9:09

Personnel 
 Shirley Scott – organ
 Stanley Turrentine – tenor saxophone
 Bob Cranshaw – bass
 Otis Finch – drums

References 

1964 albums
Albums produced by Ozzie Cadena
Albums recorded at Van Gelder Studio
Prestige Records albums
Shirley Scott albums
Stanley Turrentine albums